Etiwanda High School is a public high school in Rancho Cucamonga, California, United States. It is one of the twelve schools of the Chaffey Joint Union High School District and serves students in the Etiwanda community on the northeast side of Rancho Cucamonga.

Demographics

2010-2011 school year
Student enrollment: 3,292

Ethnic breakdown:
 American Indian/Alaskan Native: 0.3%
 Asian: 11.5
 Pacific Islander: 0.7%
 Hispanic/Latino: 45.7%
 African American: 18.5%
 White: 19.9%
 Two or more races: 3.2%

Notable alumni
Jeff Ayres (formerly Jeff Pendergraph) - former NBA player and former Arizona State basketball player
Jaylen Clark – basketball player 
Darren Collison - former NBA player and former UCLA Bruins basketball player
Maurice Edu - USA men's national team player and MLS player for the Philadelphia Union and former player of Rangers FC Stoke City FC Bursapor
Kessler Edwards - NBA player for the Brooklyn Nets and former Pepperdine forward
Broderick Hunter - Actor and model 
Kyle Isbel - MLB outfielder for the Kansas City Royals
Marvin Jones - NFL player for the Jacksonville Jaguars
Jordan McLaughlin - NBA player for the Minnesota Timberwolves and former USC guard
René Rougeau (born 1986) - Basketball player for Maccabi Haifa of the Israeli Basketball Premier League
Meagan Tandy - Miss California USA
Michael Uzowuru - American record producer
Byron Wesley - Basketball player for the Sioux Falls Skyforce and former Gonzaga basketball player

References

External links
Etiwanda High School
Chaffey Joint Union High School District

High schools in San Bernardino County, California
Public high schools in California
1983 establishments in California
Educational institutions established in 1983